Manship may refer to:  

 The characteristic of being a man
 Maleness, the characteristic, state or condition of being male
 Masculinity, The degree or property of being masculine

People 
Charles Henry Manship  (1812–1895), mayor of Jackson, Mississippi
David Manship, current publisher of The Advocate
Deborah Manship (born 1953), Welsh actress
Douglas Manship Sr., former publisher of The Advocate, namesake of The Manship Theatre at Louisiana State University
James Renwick Manship, American historian
Jeff Manship (born 1985), American baseball player
Paul Manship (1885–1966), American sculptor